Anton Gavel (born October 24, 1984) is a Slovak-German professional basketball coach and former player. He is a 1.89 m (6 ft 2 in) tall combo guard who primarily played at the shooting guard position. He is head coach for ratiopharm Ulm of the Basketball Bundesliga.

He is a four-time Slovak Player of the Year (2005, 2010, 2011, 2012).

Professional career
After playing with the youth clubs of Chemosvit, Gavel began his professional career in the German 2nd Division with Karlsuhe, during the 2001–02 season. He then moved to the German 1st Division club Giessen 46ers in 2004. He was named the German League's Rookie of the Year in 2006.

After that, he joined the Spanish League club Murcia in 2006. He then joined the Greek League club Aris Thessaloniki for the 2008–09 season. He then joined the Slovak League club Chemosvit for the start of the 2009–10 season, before signing with the German 1st Division club Brose Baskets that same season.

He was named the BBL Best Defensive Player in 2012. In 2013, he won the award again, and was as well named the BBL Finals MVP, after he won his 4th straight German League title.

On July 22, 2014, Gavel signed a two-year contract with the German champion Bayern Munich. On July 8, 2016, it was announced that he signed a two-year extension with the team. Gavel announced his retirement on August 28, 2018.

National team career

Slovak national team
Gavel played at the 2005 World University Games. He was a member of the senior men's Slovak national basketball team. Some of the tournaments that he played in with the Slovak senior men's national team included: the FIBA EuroBasket 2005 Division B, the FIBA EuroBasket 2007 Division B, the FIBA EuroBasket 2009 Division B, and the FIBA EuroBasket 2011 Division B. He also played at the FIBA EuroBasket 2013 qualification tournament.

German national team
In July 2015, two months before EuroBasket 2015, Gavel expressed his desire to represent the senior German national team. On 13 August 2015, FIBA permitted him to switch to the German national team. Gavel made his debut for Germany on 14 August 2015, against Croatia.

Coaching career
In the 2019–20 season, Gavel would be the head coach of OrangeAcademy of the German third tier ProB.

On June 25, 2022, he has signed with ratiopharm Ulm of the Basketball Bundesliga.

Career statistics

EuroLeague

|-
| style="text-align:left;"| 2010–11
| style="text-align:left;" rowspan=4 | Bamberg
| 10 || 10 || 30.8 || .434 || .333 || .857 || 2.1 || 1.9 || .6 || .0 || 8.3 || 5.7
|-
| style="text-align:left;"| 2011–12
| 10 || 10 || 29.6 || .386 || .308 || .731 || 1.7 || 2.1 || .9 || .2 || 8.5 || 8.0
|-
| style="text-align:left;"| 2012–13
| 23 || 22 || 31.5 || .441 || .367 || .794 || 2.1 || 3.0 || .7 || .1 || 12.3 || 11.5
|-
| style="text-align:left;"| 2013–14
| 10 || 10 || 28.0 || .446 || .500 || .806 || 2.5 || 3.4 || .7 || .1 || 11.6 || 12.8
|-
| style="text-align:left;"| 2014–15
| style="text-align:left;"| Bayern Munich
| 7 || 5 || 29.0 || .370 || .278 || .900 || 2.1 || 3.3 || .3 || .0 || 8.1 || 10.0
|- class="sortbottom"
| style="text-align:center;" colspan=2 | Career
| 60 || 57 || 30.1 || .431 || .365 || .803 || 2.1 || 2.8 || .7 || .1 || 10.4 || 10.0

References

External links
 Anton Gavel at acb.com 
 Anton Gavel at beko-bbl.de 
 Anton Gavel at draftexpress.com
 Anton Gavel at esake.gr 
 Anton Gavel at eurobasket.com
 Anton Gavel at euroleague.net
 Anton Gavel at fiba.com

1984 births
Living people
Aris B.C. players
BG Karlsruhe players
BK Iskra Svit players
Brose Bamberg players
CB Murcia players
FC Bayern Munich basketball players
German basketball coaches
German expatriate basketball people in Spain
German expatriate sportspeople in Greece
German men's basketball players
German people of Slovak descent
Giessen 46ers players
Liga ACB players
Point guards
Shooting guards
Slovak expatriate basketball people in Spain
Slovak expatriate sportspeople in Greece
Slovak men's basketball players
Sportspeople from Košice